Har Do Rud (also Romanized as Har Do Rūd) is a village in Natel Kenar-e Olya Rural District, in the Central District of Nur County, Mazandaran Province, Iran. At the 2006 census, its population was 276, in 65 families.

References 

Populated places in Nur County